Bicyclus sebetus is a butterfly in the family Nymphalidae. It is found in Cameroon, Angola, the Democratic Republic of the Congo, the Central African Republic, Uganda, Burundi, western Tanzania and Zambia. The habitat consists of dense lowland forests.

Adults are attracted to fermenting bananas.

References

Elymniini
Butterflies described in 1877
Butterflies of Africa
Taxa named by William Chapman Hewitson